Tear Ourselves Away is the first full-length LP by San Francisco-based indie rock band LoveLikeFire.  The album was released commercially on August 10, 2009.  A leaked version of the album first appeared on the internet in April 2009.

Track listing 
The track listing is as follows:
 "William"
 "From a Tower"
 "Crows Feet"
 "Signs"
 "I've Pissed Off My Friends"
 "Good Judgment"
 "Boredom"
 "My Left Eye"
 "Far From Home"
 "Stand in Your Shoes"
 "Everything Must Settle"

References 

2009 albums
LoveLikeFire albums